Africa '70 is an Italian non-governmental organization (NGO) working on urban planning and problems in Africa, the Middle East and Central America. It was created in 1970 and the headquarters are in Monza, Italy.

See also
Women consortium of Nigeria

References

External links 
 Africa '70 website

Non-profit organisations based in Italy